Tseng Lung-hui is a Taiwanese paralympic archer. He won the bronze medal at the Men's individual recurve - W1/W2 event at the 2008 Summer Paralympics in Beijing. At the 2012 Summer Paralympics in London, he went on to break the Paralympic record during the ranking round at the same event.

References

Taiwanese male archers
Living people
Paralympic bronze medalists for Chinese Taipei
Paralympic archers of Chinese Taipei
Archers at the 2008 Summer Paralympics
Year of birth missing (living people)
Medalists at the 2008 Summer Paralympics
Medalists at the 2012 Summer Paralympics
Paralympic medalists in archery
21st-century Taiwanese people